Jeremy Munson (born December 31, 1975) is an American businessman and politician. A member of the Republican Party of Minnesota, Munson represents District 23B in the Minnesota House of Representatives. He lives on a farm outside Lake Crystal, Minnesota.

Early life and education
Munson grew up in Brainerd, Minnesota. He earned a Bachelor of Science degree in business from the University of Minnesota Crookston.

Career 
After graduating from college, Munson lived in New York City for a year and worked as an account manager for RBC Capital Markets. He has since worked as a business analyst for the Taylor Corporation, Target, Ameriprise Financial, Allianz Life, Prime Therapeutics, Edina Realty, Aon, and the Andersen Corporation. In 2013, he founded Minnesota Hops Company, which specializes in growing hops for Minnesota's craft brewing industry.

Munson was chair of the Blue Earth County Republican Party for two years before becoming chair of the Minnesota's 1st congressional district Republicans in 2017. He is a self-employed business consultant in regulatory compliance.

Munson has supported false claims and conspiracy theories regarding the 2020 election. He has repeated the lie that Donald Trump won the election and advocated for overturning the 2020 election results. Munson was one of seven Minnesota lawmakers to sign a letter demanding that states decertify their election results despite no evidence of fraud.

Minnesota House of Representatives 
Munson was elected to the Minnesota House of Representatives in a 2018 special election, succeeding Republican incumbent Tony Cornish, who, after facing sexual harassment and assault allegations from multiple women who worked as staffers, legislators and lobbyists, signed a settlement agreement with one of the women and resigned from office. In December 2018, Munson and three other House members formed a separate New House Republican Caucus out of dissatisfaction with the House minority leadership.

On March 25, 2021, Munson proposed HF2423, a bill that would cede several Minnesota counties to South Dakota. Munson claimed, "Minnesota becomes more politically polarized every year and the metro politicians have shown us that rural Minnesotans are no longer represented by Saint Paul. It's time to leave." South Dakota governor Kristi Noem supported his idea.

U.S. House of Representatives special election campaign

In February 2022, Munson filed paperwork to run in the Minnesota's 1st congressional district special election to replace U.S. Representative Jim Hagedorn, who had died of kidney cancer earlier that month. He has been endorsed by U.S. Senator Rand Paul and U.S. Representatives Jim Jordan, Thomas Massie, and Scott Perry.

Munson faced fellow state representative Nels Pierson, former state representative Brad Finstad, and former Minnesota Republican Party chair Jennifer Carnahan in the August 9 primary election.

Electoral history

Personal life
Munson married Kallie Eberhart, of Madelia, Minnesota, in 2004. The couple have resided on their farm outside Lake Crystal, Minnesota since 2003. They have two daughters.

References

External links

 Official House of Representatives website
 Official campaign website

1970s births
21st-century American politicians
Candidates in the 2022 United States House of Representatives elections
Carlson School of Management alumni
Living people
Republican Party members of the Minnesota House of Representatives
People from Blue Earth County, Minnesota